Chalabi or Chalbi in Iran may refer to:

Chalabi, Kermanshah
Chalbi, Markazi